Stanley Ray White (born October 24, 1949) is a former American football linebacker.

Early life
White was born in Dover, Ohio and grew up in Kent, Ohio.  White attended Theodore Roosevelt High School. He was the only player in the history of Ohio High School sports to play in the state all-star games for football, basketball, and baseball. He was 1st team All State twice in football, All State in Basketball as a senior averaging 25 points a game, and All State in baseball playing catcher as a senior hitting 0.467 (He pitched a championship game and won 1-0 with 17 strikeouts). Against Ravenna his senior year he scored every way possible: He scored a touchdown and a two point conversion, kicked a field goal and an extra point, and tackled the quarterback in the end zone for a safety. His senior year ten Roosevelt players played both offense and defense, and six of those ended up playing in the NFL. White graduated in 1968.

Football career

College
White played college football at Ohio State University, where he was an All-Big Ten and All-American selection.  He also played baseball and basketball at OSU. When he left OSU he held the OSU records for career tackles, tackles in a season (1970), and tackles in a game (Michigan State 1970). He also briefly held the record for most extra points kicked in a season(1969).

NFL
White was drafted in 1972, the 438th player out of 442 taken. White played for the Baltimore Colts and the Detroit Lions. He was named First Team All NFL in 1975 by The Football News, and First Team All NFL in 1977 by The New York Daily News.

White scored two touchdowns, both from interception returns and both for the Colts; the first was in 1973 against the Houston Oilers from a Dan Pastorini interception, the second coming against the New York Giants from a Craig Morton interception in 1975. He was a UPI 1st Team All AFC linebacker in 1977. White still holds the single season NFL record for linebackers of eight interceptions in a season (1975), and is second all-time for linebackers with 34 career interceptions. He is third all-time in takeaways for linebackers with 49, behind Jack Ham and Ray Lewis. He was selected as a linebacker on the Baltimore Colts All-Time Team. He is also the only player n NFL history to have at least seven sacks and seven interceptions in a single season(1977-8 sacks,7 int). In fact only four times has a player had at 6 sacks and 6 interceptions in a season and White did it twice(1975,1977) Rodney Harrison and Dave Duerson are the other two.

White left the NFL after the 1982 season.

USFL
Following his departure from the Lions as the first active NFL player to sign with the new league, White played in the United States Football League (USFL) for the Chicago Blitz and the Arizona Wranglers. He was All USFL, and was also selected to the Madden All-Time USFL Team.

Broadcasting and other endeavors

Since 2006, White has worked as a color analyst for the Baltimore Ravens' radio broadcasts, teaming with Gerry Sandusky, who does the play-by-play, and former Ravens player Qadry Ismail. He also contributes to other programming on Baltimore station WBAL-AM. He previously worked for ESPN, NBC Radio NFL games, and Home Team Sports.

White is a lawyer, graduating magna cum laude from the University of Baltimore School of Law in 1978. He went at night during the season and full-time in the off season, completing his degree in four years. His first job was with Ron Shapiro, noted sports lawyer. His classmates included sports agents Tom Condon and Tony Agnone.

White's book, If These Walls Could Talk: Baltimore Ravens, (Triumph Books) was released in October 2017.

Personal life
White is married to Patty, and has two daughters, Meghan and Amanda, and a son, Stan jr Amanda was the National Female Athlete of the Year winning the Dial Award. She won the FootLocker National Cross Country Championship and the Mile and Two mile National Championships at the National Indoor Championships at Syracuse and was voted Performer of the meet. She ran and swam at Stanford and won three National Championships. She became a professional triathlete and was in two Olympic trials. Meghan was the Maryland Wendy’s High School Athlete of the year her senior year,was the State Two Mile Champion,and ran at UNC and Maryland.Stan jr was a High School All American football player and went on to play at The Ohio State University,winning a National Championship in 2002 and being named a First Team Academic All American his senior year.He became the only OSU football player ever to earn an MBA while still playing

References

External links
 

1949 births
Living people
American football linebackers
Arizona Wranglers players
Baltimore Colts players
Baltimore Ravens announcers
Chicago Blitz players
College football announcers
Detroit Lions players
National Football League announcers
Ohio State Buckeyes football players
Sportspeople from Kent, Ohio
People from Dover, Ohio
Players of American football from Ohio